Armageddon: Music From the Motion Picture is the soundtrack album to the 1998 Touchstone Pictures film Armageddon, released by Columbia Records and Hollywood Records on June 23, 1998. The album features several songs recorded specifically for the soundtrack, including "I Don't Want to Miss a Thing" and "What Kind of Love Are You On", performed by Aerosmith, "Remember Me", performed by Journey, and "Mister Big Time", performed by Jon Bon Jovi. Our Lady Peace's "Starseed" is a remixed version of the original. The album was commercially successful in Japan, and was certified double platinum for 400,000 copies shipped in 1999.

Track listing

Charts

Weekly charts

Year-end charts

Certifications

References

1998 soundtrack albums
1998 compilation albums
Columbia Records soundtracks
Hollywood Records soundtracks
Science fiction film soundtracks
Rock compilation albums
Rock soundtracks